The Symphony No. 2 in F-sharp minor, Op. 16, was composed by Alexander Glazunov in 1884–1886, premiered in 1886 in St Petersburg, and published in 1889. It is dedicated to the memory of Franz Liszt.

It is in four movements:
Andante maestoso – Allegro
Andante
Scherzo. Allegro
Finale. Intrada – Andante sostenuto – Allegro

References

External links

Symphonies by Alexander Glazunov
1884 compositions
Compositions in F-sharp minor